Fushi may refer to:
 Fushi (Alif Alif Atoll) (Republic of Maldives)
 Fushi (Laamu Atoll) (Republic of Maldives)
 Fushi (Thaa Atoll) (Republic of Maldives)
 Fushi (novel) by novelist Mao Dun (Mao-Tun), about the New Fourth Army Incident
 Fushi Copperweld (傅氏科普威), a Sino-American NASDAQ-traded company based in Beijing
 The historical name (膚施, Fū shī) of the city of Yan'an in Shaanxi, China
 Fushi, Yongding County (抚市镇), town in Fujian, China
 Fushi, Rong'an County (浮石镇), town in Guangxi, China
 Fushi (To Your Eternity), the main character of the manga series To Your Eternity